Tamara Nikolla Sports Palace is a multi-use sports arena in Korçë, Albania. It is owned and operated by the Municipality of Korçë and it is the home of the multidisciplinary KS Skënderbeu. The arena is located next to the Skënderbeu Stadium.

References

Indoor arenas in Albania
Basketball venues in Albania
Sports venues in Albania
Indoor track and field venues
Buildings and structures in Korçë
Sports venues completed in 1975
1975 establishments in Albania